A sky lobby is an intermediate interchange floor in a skyscraper where people can change from an express elevator that stops only at the sky lobby to a local elevator that stops at a subset of higher floors. 

When designing supertall buildings, supplying enough elevators is a problem – travellers wanting to reach a specific higher floor may conceivably have to stop at a very large number of other floors on the way up to let other passengers off and on. This increases travel time, and indirectly requires many more elevator shafts to still allow acceptable travel times – thus reducing effective floor space on each floor for all levels. 

The other main technique to increase capacity without adding elevator shafts is double-deck elevators.

Early uses of the sky lobby include the original Twin Towers of the World Trade Center and 875 North Michigan Avenue in Chicago.

Nearly 200 people were estimated to have been in the 78th floor sky lobby of the South Tower of the original World Trade Center when it was hit directly by United Airlines Flight 175, leaving only around a dozen who were able to both survive the impact and escape the tower before it collapsed.

One World Trade Center (Manhattan) 
One World Trade Center is the tallest skyscraper in New York City. Like the original World Trade Center buildings it replaced, the new building has a sky lobby to reduce the amount of space devoted to elevators. The sky lobby is on the 64th floor; Each set of five to six stories is served by a separate bank of elevators. The elevators to the sky lobby, along with the ones used for the nonstop service to the 100th-floor One World Observatory, are the fastest in the Western Hemisphere. The observatory elevator transports passengers 100 floors in under one minute.

875 North Michigan Avenue (Chicago) 
The John Hancock Center's sky lobby on the 44th floor serves only the residential portion of the building that occupies 48 floors (floors 45–92). Three express elevators run from the residential lobby on the ground floor to the 44th floor, with all three of the elevators stopping at one of the parking garage levels. At floor 44, residents transfer to two banks of three elevators. One bank serves 21 floors (floors 45–65) and the other serves 28 floors (floors 65–92). Although all six elevators stop at floor 65, this floor is roughly the same layout as the residential floors immediately above and below it. It is not a sky lobby because residents can also board elevators to higher floors at floor 44.

The tower's 44th floor sky lobby includes a pool, gym, dry cleaner, convenience store, about 700 mailboxes, two "party" rooms, a sitting area overlooking Lake Michigan, a small library, a refuse room (with trash chutes emptying here), offices for the managers of the residential condominium, and a polling station for residents during elections.

Floors above 92 are serviced by direct passenger elevators from the ground floor, and by two freight elevators that serve 55 floors (floors 44 to 98).

Buildings with sky lobbies

References

Rooms
Elevators